Eupithecia inveterata is a moth in the family Geometridae. It is found in Mongolia.

References

Moths described in 1987
inveterata
Moths of Asia